The striate slitshell, scientific name Gyrotoma lewisii, was a species of freshwater snail with a gill and an operculum, an aquatic gastropod mollusk in the family Pleuroceridae. This species was endemic to the United States. It is now extinct.

References

Pleuroceridae
Extinct gastropods
Gastropods described in 1869
Taxonomy articles created by Polbot